Pamela Jean Bryant (February 8, 1959 - December 4, 2010) was an American model and actress. She was Playboy magazine's Playmate of the Month for its April 1978 issue. Her centerfold was photographed by Richard Fegley.

Bryant first appeared in Playboy in the September 1977 pictorial "The Girls of the Big Ten". (She was attending Indiana University at the time). She went on to have an extensive acting career, appearing in films such as H.O.T.S. (1979), Don't Answer the Phone (1980) and Private Lessons (1981). Bryant also appeared on television series such as The Dukes of Hazzard, Magnum, P.I., Fantasy Island and The Love Boat.

She worked as an artist before her death from an asthma attack.

See also 
 List of people in Playboy 1970–1979

References 
2.  Death Certificate State of Hawaii showing date of death, December 5, 2010, 12:20 AM

External links 
 
 
 
 

1959 births
2010 deaths
1970s Playboy Playmates
Indiana University alumni
American film actresses
American television actresses
Actresses from Indianapolis
Deaths from asthma
20th-century American actresses
21st-century American women